William I, Count of Luxembourg (1081–1131) was count of Luxembourg (1096–1131), in succession to his elder brother Henry III of Luxembourg. They were both sons of Conrad and Clementia of Aquitaine. William was the first of his family to use the title count of Luxembourg in his documents.

Like his predecessors, he was embroiled in debates with the archbishop of Trier Bruno in 1122 and 1127, leading to William's excommunication.

Around 1105 he married Mathilde or Luitgarde of Northeim, daughter of Kuno, count of Beichlingen, and had three children:
 Conrad II († 1136), count of Luxembourg
 William, count of Gleiberg, documented in 1131 and in 1158
 Liutgarde (* 1120 - † 1170), married Henri II (* 1125 - † 1211), count of Grandpré

References

Sources

1081 births
1131 deaths
Counts of Luxembourg
House of Luxembourg